Taki may refer to:

People 
 Princess Taki (died 751), Japanese princess during the Asuka period
 Rentarō Taki (1879-1903), Japanese pianist and composer
 Michiyo Taki (fl. 1927), Japanese football player
 Mohamed Taki Abdoulkarim (1936–1998), former president of the Comoros
 Taki Theodoracopulos (born 1936), Greek-born journalist, founder of Taki's Magazine
 TAKI 183 (born 1953-1954), American graffiti artist
 Taki Inoue (born 1963), retired Japanese racing driver
 Pierre Taki (born 1967), Japanese singer and actor, member of Denki Groove
 Mohamed Taki (athlete) (born 1971), Moroccan runner
 Masami Taki (born 1972), Japanese football manager
 Natsuki Taki (born 1993), Japanese announcer
 Yuta Taki (born 1999), Japanese football player
 Taki Saito (born 2000), Filipina actress and singer, member of Faky
 Ta-ki (born 2005), Japanese contestant in the K-pop survival show I-La

Characters 
 Taki (Soulcalibur), a fictional female ninja
 Taki Matsuya, a comic book character in the Marvel comics universe

Places 
 Taki (India), a town in West Bengal
 Taki, Iran, a village in Gilan Province
 Taki, Mie, a town in Japan

Other uses 
 Taki, another name for the Maori wero challenge
 Taki (card game), similar to UNO

See also 
 Taqi (disambiguation)
 Takis (disambiguation)
 Taki's Magazine, a political online magazine
 "Taki Ongoy", a 1986 musical work of Argentine composer Victor Heredia
 Taki Taki, a former name of Sranan Tongo, a language of Suriname
 Taki Unquy, a 16th-century movement in the Peruvian Andes

Japanese-language surnames